Rob Cross is a former college basketball coach of the Murray State Racers women's basketball program.

Career
He served as assistant coach of the Racers from 1995 through 2008, before serving as head coach until 2017. In 2009, he was named Ohio Valley Conference Coach of the Year after his team won the regular season championship.

Head coaching record

References

Living people
American women's basketball coaches
Murray State Racers women's basketball coaches
Year of birth missing (living people)